The 157th Boat Race took place on 26 March 2011.  Held annually, the event is a side-by-side rowing race between crews from the Universities of Oxford and Cambridge along the River Thames.  The race was won by Oxford.  Of the eighteen competitors in the race, thirteen were British.  The race was sponsored for the second time by Xchanging.

Oxford won the Women's Boat Race by four lengths while Cambridge's Goldie beat Oxford's Isis in the reserve race.

Background
The Boat Race is a side-by-side rowing competition between the University of Oxford and the University of Cambridge.  First held in 1829, the competition is a  race along The Championship Course on the River Thames in southwest London. The rivalry is a major point of honour between the two universities and followed throughout the United Kingdom and worldwide. Cambridge went into the race as reigning champions, having won the 2010 race by  lengths, and led overall with 80 victories to Oxford's 75 (excluding the "dead heat" of 1877). The race was sponsored by Xchanging for the seventh consecutive year, and it was the second time that the title had been given over to sponsorship; as such it was referred to as the "Xchanging Boat Race". The BBC broadcast the event in the United Kingdom, in high-definition for the first time.

The first Women's Boat Race took place in 1927, but did not become an annual fixture until the 1960s. Until 2014, the contest was conducted as part of the Henley Boat Races, but as of the 2015 race, it is held on the River Thames, on the same day as the men's main and reserve races.  The reserve race, contested between Oxford's Isis boat and Cambridge's Goldie boat has been held since 1965.  It usually takes place on the Tideway, prior to the main Boat Race.

Crews
The Cambridge crew was "slightly heavier" than their opponents, weighing in at a ceremony at City Hall overseen by Boris Johnson at  more per rower than Oxford. Thirteen of the eighteen competitors were British, the highest proportion for a decade. Of the two crews, Cambridge featured three returning Blues to Oxford's one. Oxford University Boat Club's president Ben Myers suggested "we're home-grown guys, we know about the Boat Race and we're keen". Oxford were coached once again by Sean Bowden, who set their boat up as "tandem rigged" (where two consecutive crew row on the same side of the boat), the first time such a configuration had been used in the Boat Race since 1975. Steve Trapmore was making his debut as Cambridge's coach. Oxford's stroke, Simon Hislop, had recovered from testicular cancer in time to participate in the race.

Races

Oxford won the toss and elected to start from the Surrey station. Despite falling slightly behind early on in the race, Cambridge rowed their way back into contention and umpire Rob Clegg was forced to warn both crews as the coxes steered towards one another. Following a brief clash of oars, Oxford started to pull away again at Harrods Furniture Depository.  At Hammersmith Bridge, the Oxford cox called for push, shouting "2003" to invoke memories of the narrowest margin of victory in the history of the event in the 2003 race. Passing St Paul's School, Oxford took the lead and steered across and in front of the Cambridge boat.  Despite attempts to keep in touch with Oxford, Cambridge fell farther and farther behind, and Oxford passed the finishing post four lengths clear in a time of 17 minutes and 37 seconds.

Oxford won the 66th Women's Boat Race by four lengths, their third consecutive victory. Oxford's Isis beat Cambridge's Goldie in the reserve race by six lengths.

Reaction

Cambridge number four Henry Cubasch remarked "They had the strength, character and went for it; we just let them slip." Oxford's Constantine Louloudis said "We held Cambridge in high regard.  But I certainly didn't predict a margin like that." Cambridge president Rasumussen called it a "stinging defeat".

References

External links

2011 in English sport
2011 in rowing
2011 sports events in London
The Boat Race
March 2011 sports events in the United Kingdom